Gabriel Rodríguez Aguiló (born August 19, 1973) is a Puerto Rican politician affiliated with the New Progressive Party (PNP). He has been a member of the Puerto Rico House of Representatives since 2004.

Early life
Gabriel Rodríguez Aguiló was born on August 19, 1973 from Ciales, Puerto Rico.

Professional career
Rodríguez worked for four years as a pharmacy assistant until 2003.

Political career
Rodríguez Aguiló was chosen by his party at the 2003 primaries for an election spot. He was elected as a Representative for District 13 at the 2004 general elections. During his first term, he served as President of the Commission of Health, and the Joint Commission of Health Rights.

In 2008, Rodríguez Aguiló was reelected for a second term as representative. After being sworn in, Rodríguez was appointed as Speaker Pro Tempore of the House of Representatives.

Rodríguez was reelected in the 2012 general election and the 2016 general election.

References

External links
Gabriel Rodríguez Aguiló on CamaraDeRepresentantes.org

|-

|-

|-

1973 births
Living people
New Progressive Party members of the House of Representatives of Puerto Rico
People from Ciales, Puerto Rico